The 1994 Special Honours in New Zealand was a Special Honours Lists, dated 6 February 1994, making one appointment to the Order of New Zealand.

Order of New Zealand (ONZ)
Ordinary member
 The Right Honourable Sir Thaddeus Pearcey McCarthy .

References

Special honours
Special honours